"Blow" is a song by French DJ and record producer Martin Solveig and Filipino-Dutch DJ and producer Laidback Luke. The song was released in France as a digital download on 6 January 2014. The song was written and produced by Martin Solveig and Julio Mejia and Laidback Luke.

Music video
A music video to accompany the release of "Blow" was first released onto YouTube on 18 December 2013 at a total length of four minutes and thirty-six seconds.

Track listing

Chart performance

Weekly charts

Release history

References

2014 singles
2014 songs
Martin Solveig songs
Songs written by Martin Solveig